The 1980 Missouri Valley Conference men's basketball tournament was played after the conclusion of the 1979–1980 regular season at Robertson Memorial Field House on the campus of Bradley University in Peoria, Illinois.

Bracket

References

1979–80 Missouri Valley Conference men's basketball season
Missouri Valley Conference men's basketball tournament
Missouri Valley Conference men's basketball tournament